Been Caught Buttering is the second album of the Austrian death metal band Pungent Stench. It was originally released in 1991 on Nuclear Blast. The original album art, which depicted two severed, partially decomposed heads kissing (in fact, it is one head which had been sawed in half by Joel-Peter Witkin), had to be changed for the Australian release. The cover art can also be seen as a parody of a famous picture with Leonid Brezhnev and Erich Honecker kissing at the celebrations of the 30th birthday of the former German Democratic Republic in 1979.

Track listing
 "Shrunken and Mummified Bitch" – 3:50
 "Happy Re-birth Day" – 3:28
 "Games of Humiliation" – 5:12
 "S.M.A.S.H." – 2:36
 "Brainpan Blues" – 4:07
 "And Only Hunger Remains" – 5:58
 "Sputter Supper" – 3:25
 "Sick Bizarre Defaced Creation" – 4:15
 "Splatterday Night Fever" – 4:38

Bonus tracks
 Daddy Cruel - 3:33
 The Ballad of Mangled Homeboys - 3:30

Pungent Stench albums
1991 albums